Anthocharis lanceolata, the gray marble, is a butterfly in the family Pieridae. The species was first described by Hippolyte Lucas in 1852. Its range is the west coast of United States and Canada.

References

Anthocharis
Butterflies of North America
Butterflies described in 1852